A Melbourne Derby match during the 2022–23 A-League Men season took place between Melbourne City FC and Melbourne Victory FC  on 17 December 2022 at the Melbourne Rectangular Stadium, in Melbourne, Australia. The match was abandoned in the 22nd minute after several incidents of hooliganism took place both on and off the field. Throughout the match, supporters of both teams both ignited and threw flares. 

In the 20th minute, the match was interrupted due to flares being ignited and thrown onto the pitch, two of which had been thrown by Melbourne Victory supporters. Conflict arose when Melbourne City goalkeeper Tom Glover, who was defending the goal in front of the Melbourne Victory supporters end, picked up and threw the flares away from the pitch, the second of which was thrown into the crowd of Victory supporters. This sparked a pitch invasion by between 100–200 spectators, who proceeded to attack Glover and match referee Alex King, both of whom sustained minor injuries. The match was abandoned as a result.

On 23 December, Football Australia handed down interim sanctions on both clubs while a full investigation was being conducted. Both teams had their active supporter bays closed, with Melbourne Victory further sanctioned with supporter restrictions: travelling support was banned for away games, while home games were restricted to only valid club members.

Background
The match was the 40th Melbourne Derby to be played since the derby's inception in 2010. The match was the second of three scheduled Melbourne Derbies to be played that season, with Melbourne City being the designated home team for this match; the previous derby, a designated Melbourne Victory home game, ended in a 2-0 victory to Melbourne City. 

On 12 December 2022, just a few days before the derby, the Australian Professional Leagues announced an agreement with Destination NSW that would see the 2023, 2024, and 2025 A-League Men Grand Finals hosted in Sydney, as opposed to the traditional format of being hosted by the finalist that finished higher during the regular season. This announcement was met with widespread opposition from fans, former players and active support groups, with Original Style Melbourne and Melbourne City Terrace, the active supporter groups of Melbourne Victory and Melbourne City respectively, agreeing to stage a walkout in the 20th minute of the Melbourne Derby on 17 December 2022 in order to protest against the APL's decision.

Match

Events

Before the game started, supporters of both teams chanted against the APL's decision to award A-League Grand Final hosting rights to Sydney for the next three years, as well as displaying banners criticising the decision in the 20th minute. Throughout the match, supporters of both teams ignited flares, some of which were thrown on the pitch. Additionally, firecrackers were exploded.

In the 20th minute of the match, referee Alex King suspended the game due to flares being thrown onto the pitch. Two of the flares had been thrown by Melbourne Victory supporters. Melbourne City goalkeeper Tom Glover, who was defending the goal in front of the Melbourne Victory supporters end, picked up and threw the flares away from the pitch, the second of which was thrown into the crowd of Victory supporters. This sparked a pitch invasion by between 100–200 spectators, during which a metal bucket of sand, which had been used by match officials in order to extinguish ignited flares, was thrown by a pitch invader at Glover, which resulted in Glover sustaining a concussion and a cut to the face. Additionally, referee Alex King, a TV cameraman and two security guards were all injured in the melee. Players and coaches from both teams were ordered off the field, while pitch stewards and staff attempted to shield the players and staff from the pitch invaders. After a lengthy delay, the game was finally abandoned at 1–0, with players from both teams being physically and psychologically affected.

According to Victoria Police, about $150,000 worth of damage was caused to the stadium during the match, and about 80 flares or fireworks were set off.

Details

Reactions
The pitch invasion, and the violence instigated against Tom Glover, Alex King and matchday officials and staff, were widely condemned by both past and present players, coaches and commentators. Melbourne Victory released a statement apologising to Tom Glover, Alex King and the TV cameraman for the injuries they sustained, condemning the actions of spectators who entered the pitch, and affirming that their actions are not acceptable under any circumstance and have no place in football. Football Australia issued a statement condemning the actions of the pitch invaders, saying that "such behaviour has no place in Australian Football", with the organisation committing to "a full investigation to commence immediately, where strong sanctions will be handed down".

Disciplinary proceedings
On 19 December 2022, Football Australia issued Melbourne Victory with a show cause notice, giving them until 9am Wednesday 21 December to justify why the club should not face serious sanctions for bringing the game into disrepute through the conduct of its supporters. Possible penalties that the Victory faced included financial penalties, loss of competition points and/or playing matches behind closed doors, or on neutral territory.

On 21 December 2022, Football Australia announced that it was issuing life bans to two supporters, a 23-year-old man from Craigieburn and a 19-year-old man from Meadow Heights, through their perpetration of offences including entering the field of play without authorisation, engaging in conduct that did or was likely to cause harm or endanger others, and through using an item (bucket) with the intent to cause damage or harm. This lifetime ban covers all football-related activity in Australia including attending Football Australia-sanctioned football matches and events including all A-Leagues, Australia Cup, National Premier League, and National Team matches and registering as a football participant. Additionally, the two men could potentially face various criminal charges including violent disorder, alleged assault, possession of a flare, discharging missiles, entry to sporting competition space, disrupting a match, public nuisance, riotous behaviour, and discharge and possession of flares.

On 22 December 2022, Football Australia announced that it was issuing further bans to 8 spectators, aged between 18 and 28 years old, over their involvement in the events of the Derby, with the spectators' bans spanning five years to twenty years. The violations which led to the imposition of these bans included entering the field of play without authorisation, engaging in conduct that did or was likely to cause harm or endanger others, engaging in conduct that did or was likely to cause unlawful damage to the venue or the various forms of infrastructure within the venue, and throwing projectiles and/or missiles in a dangerous manner.

On 23 December 2022, Football Australia imposed interim restrictions on Melbourne Victory, which included the closure of active supporter areas, banning away support at Victory away matches, and restricting attendance at Victory home matches to only valid club members.

References

Brawls in team sports
Association football riots
2022 riots
Association football hooliganism
Riots and civil disorder in Australia
2022 controversies
December 2022 sports events in Australia
Melbourne City FC matches
Melbourne Victory FC matches
Soccer in Melbourne
2022–23 A-League Men season